Ostafyevo is a railway station of Line D2 of the Moscow Central Diameters in Moscow. It was opened in 2020.

Gallery

References

Railway stations in Moscow
Railway stations of Moscow Railway
Railway stations in Russia opened in 2020
Line D2 (Moscow Central Diameters)  stations